The Marcel coal mine is a large mine in the south of Poland in Radlin near Wodzisław Śląski, Silesian Voivodeship, 260 km south-west of the capital, Warsaw.

Until 1949 it was called "Emma". In 1995 KWK Marcel was connected with 1 Maja Coal Mine.

Having estimated reserves of 76 million tonnes of coal near Marklowice and Wodzisław Śląski. The annual coal production is around 2.75 million tonnes.

See also 
 1 Maja Coal Mine

External links 
 "Marcel" Official site

Coal mines in Poland
Wodzisław County
Coal mines in Silesian Voivodeship